Gesù Cristo Redentore ("Jesus Christ the Redeemer") is a Catholic church in Alcamo, in the province of Trapani, Italy.

Foundation 
On June 14, 1985, the bishop of the diocese of Trapani, Mons. Emanuele Romano, established a new Parish dedicated to Gesù Cristo Redentore; it was entrusted to Don Benedetto Cottone (the parson of this Church for 23 consecutive years) starting his experience in small premises located in Via Kennedy, which remained the place of communion for 19 years.

After two years in another place located in Via Tre Santi, they succeeded in completing a hospitable, large and beautiful church. It has been the centre of the parish life of Sant’Anna district, for 10 years up to now and on April 4, 2015, on the 30th anniversary of the foundation, they have organized a very great feast with sport, cultural and religious events, including the procession which was authorized by the Bishop of Trapani Mons. Pietro Maria Fragnelli. In 2016 they wanted to repeat this experience, thanks to the parishioners who collaborated with the present parson, Don Franco Finazzo, for the success of the different events.

Description 

In the planning of the overall parish "Gesù Cristo Redentore", they have followed the guidelines recommended by the Conferenza Episcopale Italiana (Italian Episcopal Conference) in 1993.

The church, in a central position in the district of "Sant’Anna" (in the area of Via Kennedy), is an example of how the use of glued laminated timber allows linking functionality and beauty; it is larger than 600 square metres and, in accordance with the regulations on the removing of architectural barriers, it has a sloping floor towards the Presbytery (architecture), with a declivity which allows optimal participation to the believers during the liturgical functions.

It is made up of the Presbytery, located in the apse, with a step higher than the hall, the Ambon and the sacramental area, with a wooden dome (in glued laminated timber) above it; the floor here is realized with polychrome marbles and so believers can differentiate the meaning of the different liturgical functions; a central nave, corresponding with the hall, and with about 600 seats, and two aisles for the coming in and out of people, and for the processional route during the functions; the parvis which permits the outdoor celebrations with great participation of believers, thanks to its position on the top of the staircases.

Initially, the plan also included the building of the bell tower, with a small dome surmounted by a cross, with seven bronze bells.

The premises for the parish activities include a large hall, in accordance with the regulations on the removing of architectural barriers, which is a little sloping, letting people have better visual participation, and nine rooms for the catechism lessons. The arcade (architecture), three metres large and around the main structure, is like a covered walkway for people coming out of the hall and the other rooms on the ground floor, from the parvis towards the rectory and the sacristy on the eastern side, and towards the public car-park on the western side.

Finally, the open spaces include a car park, on the southwest side with access from via Kennedy, a basketball field, and some arranged green areas, where there are plants characteristic of the Mediterranean flora.

Works 
There are three very beautiful sculptures made by Massimiliano Apicella from Turin:
 Gesù Cristo Redentore, in Carrara white marble (2006)
 The Lord's table (altar), represented by two hands while breaking bread (2006, in Carrara white marble too)
 The Ambon (2009, in red marble) with the symbols of Alpha and Omega
Inside the Church there are also these works:
 the Crucifixion, an icon
 The Pentecost, a painting by Stefano Papa
 Our Lady with the Infant Jesus, a painting by Valentina Cavarretta
 The Divine Mercy, a painting by Enza Ferrera (2006)
 Gesù Cristo Redentore (Jesus Christ the Redeemer), a plaster statue, used during the procession.

References

External links 

 
 
 
 

Roman Catholic churches in Alcamo